The Postcode Plants Database was a UK resource for identifying locally native plants and species based on postcode, hosted by the Natural History Museum in London.

This resource has been replaced by the analysis pages on the NBN Atlas website. There you can choose to display any groups of UK wildlife within a radius of any given post-code.

See also
 Plants for a Future – online plant database

References

Online botany databases
Natural history of the United Kingdom
Conservation in the United Kingdom
Databases in the United Kingdom
Biology websites
Flora of Great Britain